The Santa Barbara & Ventura Colleges of Law is a private law school in Santa Barbara and Ventura, California. It is accredited by the WASC Senior College and University Commission and is approved by the Committee of Bar Examiners of the State Bar of California.

History
The Ventura campus was founded in 1969 and the Santa Barbara campus was added in 1975. As of 2007, the colleges have over 1,600 alumni. In 2016, Jackie Gardina was appointed Dean and Chief Academic Officer, succeeding Heather Georgakis, who served COL for three decades, including 15 years as Dean.

Accreditation
The Colleges of Law is accredited by the WASC Senior College and University Commission. Additionally, the Juris Doctor program has been approved by the Committee of Bar Examiners of the State Bar of California for more than 30 years. This approval applies to both campuses (Santa Barbara and Ventura). Neither campus is accredited by the American Bar Association. Upon graduation, students are eligible to take the California bar exam and practice law in California.

Academics

Juris Doctor
The Juris Doctor program is both full-time and part-time day and evening curriculum. Classes are generally held on Mondays, Tuesdays, and Thursdays in Santa Barbara and on Mondays, Wednesdays, and Thursdays in Ventura. The academic calendar consists of two 15-week semesters and a 10-week summer term. Typically, students complete the program within three to four years.

Master of Legal Studies
In 2012, The Colleges of Law added a Master of Legal Studies (M.L.S.) degree to their course offerings. This program is available to students online, with an option to complete a campus residency. Upon entering the program, students choose between two concentrations: Frontiers in Law or Regulatory Compliance and Legal Risk Management. The M.L.S. degree can be completed in 18 months.

Notable alumni

 Robert Krimmer, lawyer and former actor
Chris Meagher, political advisor

References

External links
 

Law schools in California
Universities and colleges in Santa Barbara County, California
Universities and colleges in Ventura County, California
Educational institutions established in 1969
1969 establishments in California
Private universities and colleges in California